The 2017 A-League Grand Final was the twelfth A-League Grand Final, and was played on 7 May 2017,  at Allianz Stadium in Sydney. The match was contested between Sydney FC and Melbourne Victory who finished the 2016–17 season first and second respectively. This was the third time the teams met in a final, previously playing each other in 2010 and 2015. Both clubs qualified for the 2018 AFC Champions League due to their league position and participation in the Grand Final.

Sydney FC won the match, defeating Melbourne Victory 4–2 on penalties after the match finished 1–1 after extra time. This marked the third occasion Sydney FC had won an A-League Championship.

Teams
In the following table, finals until 2004 were in the National Soccer League era, since 2006 were in the A-League era.

Route to the final

Match

Summary

Details

Statistics

Broadcasting
As with the previous season, the 2017 A-League Grand Final was broadcast in Australia on Foxtel and on free-to-air TV, with SBS showing the game on a one-hour delay. The 2017 Grand Final was the most watched A-League match on Fox Sports ever, with an average of 367,000 viewers and a peak of 553,000. This number was a 10% increase on the previous highest A-League match, the 2014 Grand Final between Brisbane Roar and Western Sydney Wanderers.

See also
 2016–17 A-League
 List of A-League honours

References

External links
 Official A-League Website

2016–17 A-League season
2010s in Sydney
A-League Men Grand Finals
May 2017 sports events in Australia
Melbourne Victory FC matches
Soccer in Sydney
Sydney FC matches
A-League Grand Final 2017